Ochsenfurt station is a railway station in the municipality of Ochsenfurt, located in the district of Würzburg in Lower Franconia, Germany.

References

Railway stations in Bavaria
Buildings and structures in Würzburg (district)
Railway stations in Germany opened in 1864